Takers and Leavers is an EP by Dr. Dog. It was released a year before their LP, We All Belong, which re-released "Ain't It Strange" and "Die Die Die".

The first 1000 copies had custom covers, which featured various images and assortments of random art. The standard EP was produced later that month.

Track listing

Personnel
Tables: bass, vocals
Taxi: lead guitar, vocals
Text: keyboards
Triumph: drums, vocals
Thanks: rhythm guitar, vocals
Harmonica John: harmonica on Livin' A Dream

Title of EP
The title Takers and Leavers is from a poem recited at the end of Livin' a Dream, the final track of the EP. Well, I know there's always been greed and green acres, and war and peace makers. And then there's your takers and your leavers, your havers and your needers.
The poem was written by Dr. Dog's Scott McMicken.

References

2006 EPs
Dr. Dog albums